As part of the British honours system, the Special Honours are issued at the Queen's pleasure at any given time. The Special Honours refer to the awards of the Order of the Garter, Order of the Thistle, Order of Merit, Royal Victorian Order and the Order of St John. Life Peerages are at times also awarded as special honours.

Life Peer

Conservative Party

 Michael Farmer, to be Baron Farmer, of Bishopsgate in the City of London – 5 September 2014
 Ranbir Singh Suri, to be Baron Suri, of Ealing in the London Borough of Ealing - 11 September 2014
 Natalie Jessica Evans, to be Baroness Evans of Bowes Park, of Bowes Park in the London Borough of Haringey - 12 September 2014
 The Hon. Diana Mary Harding, to be Baroness Harding of Winscombe, of Nether Compton in the County of Dorset - 15 September 2014
 The Hon. Caroline Elizabeth Chisholm, to be Baroness Chisholm of Owlpen, of Owlpen in the County of Gloucestershire - 16 September 2014
 Joanna Shields,  to be Baroness Shields, of Maida Vale in the City of Westminster - 16 September 2014
 Sir Stuart Rose, to be Baron Rose of Monewden, of Monewden in the County of Suffolk - 17 September 2014
 Andrew Timothy Cooper, to be Baron Cooper of Windrush, of Chipping Norton in the County of Oxfordshire - 17 September 2014
 Nosheena Shaheen Mobarik,  to be Baroness Mobarik, of Mearns in the County of Renfrewshire - 23 September 2014
 Arminka Helic,  to be Baroness Helic, of Millbank in the City of Westminster - 23 September 2014
 Karren Brady,  to be Baroness Brady, of  Knightsbridge in the City of Westminster - 25 September 2014
 Martin Callanan, to be Baron Callanan, of Low Fell in the County of Tyne and Wear - 26 September 2014

Labour Party

 Dame Gail Rebuck,  to be Baroness Rebuck, of Bloomsbury in the London Borough of Camden - 23 September 2014
 Christopher John Lennie, to be Baron Lennie, of Longsands Tynemouth in the County of Tyne and Wear - 25 September 2014
 Michael Cashman,  to be Baron Cashman, of Limehouse in the London Borough of Tower Hamlets - 26 September 2014

Liberal Democrat Party

 Christopher Francis Fox, to be Baron Fox, of Leominster in the County of Herefordshire - 11 September 2014
 Julie Smith, to be Baroness Smith of Newnham, of Crosby in the County of Merseyside - 12 September 2014
 David Goddard, to be Baron Goddard of Stockport, of Stockport in the County of Greater Manchester - 15 September 2014
 Paul Scriven, to be Baron Scriven, of Mearns in the County of Renfrewshire - 23 September 2014
 Barbara Lilian Janke, to be Baroness Janke, of Clifton in the City and County of Bristol - 26 September 2014
 Kathryn Mary Pinnock, to be Baroness Pinnock, of Cleckheaton in the County of West Yorkshire - 26 September 2014

Democratic Unionist Party

 William Hay, to be Baron Hay of Ballyore, of Ballyore in the City of Londonderry - 18 December 2014

Crossbench

 General Sir David Richards,  to be Baron Richards of Herstmonceux, of Emsworth in the County of Hampshire – 24 February 2014
 Sir Andrew Green,  to be Baron Green of Deddington, of Deddington in the County of Oxfordshire - 2 December 2014
 Sir Jonathan Evans,  to be Baron Evans of Weardale, of Toys Hill in the County of Kent - 5 December 2014
 Alison Wolf,  to be Baroness Wolf of Dulwich, of Dulwich in the London Borough of Southwark – 5 December 2014
 Sir Robert Rogers,  to be Baron Lisvane, of Blakemere in the County of Herefordshire and of Lisvane in the City and County of Cardiff - 15 December 2014

Most Noble Order of the Garter

Knight of the Order of the Garter (KG) 
 The Rt Hon. The Lord King of Lothbury,  – 23 April 2014

Lady of the Order of the Garter (LG) 
 The Rt Hon. The Baroness Manningham-Buller,  – 23 April 2014

Order of the Companions of Honour

Companion of the Order of the Companions of Honour (CH) 
 The Rt Hon. Kenneth Clarke,  - 8 August 2014

Knight Bachelor 

 Sir Richard William Ground,  – 20 January 2014
 The Hon. Mr Justice James Michael Dingemans – 18 February 2014
 The Hon. Mr Justice Nicholas Nigel Green – 18 February 2014
 The Hon. Mr Justice Anthony Hayden – 18 February 2014
 The Hon. Mr Justice Clive Buckland Lewis – 18 February 2014
 The Hon. Mr Justice Christopher George Nugee – 18 February 2014
 The Hon. Mr Justice Stephen Edmund Phillips – 18 February 2014
 Oliver Heald,  – 8 August 2014

Most Honourable Order of the Bath

Knight Grand Cross of the Order of the Bath (GCB) 
Honorary
 François Hollande, President of France - 5 June 2014
 Tony Tan, President of Singapore - 24 October 2014

Most Distinguished Order of St Michael and St George

Knight/Dame Grand Cross of the Order of St Michael and St George (GCMG) 
 Dame Marguerite Matilda Pindling, Governor-General of The Bahamas - 7 October 2014
 Rodney Errey Lawrence Williams, Governor General of Antigua and Barbuda - 17 October 2014

Knight Commander of the Order of St Michael and St George (KCMG)
 The Rt Hon. Alan Duncan,  - 22 July 2014
 The Rt Hon. Hugh Robertson,  - 22 July 2014

Dame Commander of the Order of St Michael and St George (DCMG)
Honorary
 Angelina Jolie, For services to UK foreign policy and the campaign to end warzone sexual violence – 14 June 2014

Companion of the Order of St Michael and St George (CMG)
Honorary
 Despina Zernioti, For services to UK/Greek relations and to the Order of St Michael and St George – 1 April 2014

Royal Victorian Order

Knight Grand Cross of the Royal Victorian Order (GCVO) 
 Sir Peter Ricketts  - 30 June 2014

Knight Commander of the Royal Victorian Order (KCVO) 
 Julian King  - 4 July 2014
 The Very Rev Gilleasbuig Macmillan , on retirement as Chaplain to The Queen in Scotland and Dean of the Order of the Thistle. - 11 July 2014
 Prof. John Cunningham  - on retirement as Head of the Medical Household and Physician to The Queen. - 5 August 2014
 Air Marshal Ian Macfadyen  - on relinquishment of the appointment of Constable and Governor, Windsor Castle. - 5 August 2014
 The Rt Rev. Christopher Hill - on relinquishing the role of Clerk of the Closet and Head of Her Majesty's College of Chaplains. - 18 November 2014

Commander of the Royal Victorian Order (CVO) 
 Brigadier John Edward Bruce Smedley . On retirement as Private Secretary to The Earl and Countess of Wessex. – 18 March 2014
 Rebecca Lucy Kitteridge; on relinquishing the role of Secretary of the Cabinet and Clerk of the Executive Council in New Zealand. – 31 March 2014
 Sir Paul John James Britton, ; on retirement as the Prime Minister's Appointments Secretary. – 8 May 2014
 Philip Brian Everett, On relinquishment of his appointment as Deputy Ranger, Windsor Great Park. – 17 June 2014
 Kara Justine Owen - 30 June 2014
 Euan Werran McDonald Curnow . On retirement as Veterinary Surgeon to the Royal Studs. - 5 August 2014
 George Hassall . On retirement as Director, Royal and Diplomatic Affairs, Jaguar Land Rover. - 5 August 2014
 Major David Rankin-Hunt . On retirement as Administrator and Assistant to the Surveyors, Royal Collection Trust. - 5 August 2014
 The Rt Hon. Commander The Earl of Rosslyn, ; on relinquishing his appointment as Head of Royalty & Specialist Protection Department. - 29 September 2014
 The Reverend Prebendary William Sievwright Scott; on relinquishing the role of Sub-Dean of Her Majesty's Chapels Royal, Sub-Dean and Domestic Chaplain of the Ecclesiastical Household, Deputy Clerk of the Closet and Sub-Almoner.

Lieutenant of the Royal Victorian Order (LVO) 
 Mark Thomas Fraser, Deputy Official Secretary to the Governor-General of Australia – 26 January 2014
 Sophie Abigail Guelff - 30 June 2014
 Samuel Fitzsimons  - 4 July 2014
 Michael Alan Ebbage , on retirement as Accountant, Sandringham Estate. - 11 July 2014
 Jill Elizabeth Kelsey , on relinquishing the role of Deputy Archivist, Royal Archives. - 14 November 2014

Member of the Royal Victorian Order (MVO) 
 William James Frecklington,  – For coach building services to The Queen.
 Claire-Anne Haines - 30 June 2014
 Matthew Hallett - 30 June 2014
 Alys Marguerite O’Connor - 30 June 2014
 Captain Shuresh Kumar Thapa, The Royal Gurkha Rifles – on relinquishment of his appointment as Queen's Gurkha Orderly Officer
 Captain Kumar Gurung, 10 Queen's Own Gurkha Logistic Regiment RLC – on relinquishment of his appointment as Queen's Gurkha Orderly Officer
 Sharon Kathleen Gaddes-Croasdale - on relinquishing the role of Florist, Royal Household. - 5 August 2014

Most Excellent Order of the British Empire

Knight Grand Cross of the Order of the British Empire (GBE) 
Honorary
Ratan Tata, For services to UK/India relations, inward investment to the UK and philanthropy

Dame Commander of the Order of the British Empire (DBE) 
 The Hon. Mrs. Justice Geraldine Mary Andrews – 18 February 2014
 The Hon. Mrs. Justice Sue Lascelles Carr – 18 February 2014
 The Hon. Mrs. Justice Frances Silvia Patterson – 18 February 2014
 The Hon. Mrs. Justice Ingrid Ann Simler – 18 February 2014

Knight Commander of the Order of the British Empire (KBE) 
Honorary
 Haruo Naito, For services to Japanese investment in the UK and to Anglo-Japanese relations
 Admiral Édouard Guillaud, For services to the Lancaster House Treaty and UK/France military relations
 Michael Bloomberg, for his "prodigious entrepreneurial and philanthropic endeavors, and the many ways in which they have benefited the United Kingdom and the U.K.-U.S. special relationship."
 John Franklyn Mars, for services to British business and the economy.

Commander of the Order of the British Empire (CBE) 
 Brigadier Duncan Francis Capps
 Brigadier Rupert Timothy Herbert Jones, 
 Colonel Robert James Rider
 Brigadier Maurice John Sheen, 
 Acting Air Commodore Christopher Edward John Brazier
 Air Commodore Philip James Beach, 
 Air Commodore John Drew Maas

Honorary
 Tadakazu Kimura, For services to international sponsorship and Anglo-Japanese cultural understanding
 Gennady Nikolayevitch Rozhdestvensky, For services to music

Officer of the Order of the British Empire (OBE) 
 Surgeon Commander Joanna Mary Elizabeth Leason
 Acting Colonel Simon John Scott, Royal Marines
 Lieutenant Colonel Thomas Howard Bewick, 
 Lieutenant Colonel Jason Richard Kerr
 Lieutenant Colonel Jonathan Swift
 Commander Irvine Graham Lindsay

Member of the Order of the British Empire (MBE) 

 Major Richard Charles Morris, Royal Marines
 Acting Major Ross Thomas Boyd
 Major Kieth Anthony Bryan Child
 Major Stephen Philip Dallard
 Captain James Jackson Dear
 Acting Lieutenant Colonel Christopher John Fisher
 Staff Sergeant James Forster
 Captain Euan James Grant
 Major James Andrew Hadfield
 Warrant Officer Class 2 Alan Fraser Hamilton
 Major Rupert Edward Charles Kitching
 Major Gary Robertson
 Major James Samuel Skelton
 Reverend (Wing Commander) Giles Leslie Legood
 Lieutenant Commander Camilla Simpson Meek
 Warrant Officer 2 Engineering Technician (Marine Engineering) Christopher Mullan, 
 Wing Commander Graham Ifor August

Conspicuous Gallantry Cross (CGC) 

 Corporal Anthony Stazicker
 Lance Corporal Simon George Moloney, Royal Marines

Military Cross (MC) 

 Major Geoffrey Richard Brocklehurst
 Warrant Officer Class 1 Patrick Hyde
 Private Wesley Robert Masters
 Corporal William Joseph Mills
 Captain Alexander Ryland Pickthall
 Corporal James Richard Lawrence Walker

Distinguished Flying Cross (DFC) 

 Flight Lieutenant Charles Peter Lockyear

Royal Red Cross

Associate of the Royal Red Cross (ARRC) 
 Major Kerry Jane McFadden-Newman

Queen's Gallantry Medal (QGM) 

 Captain Michael Robert John Kennedy
 Sergeant Kevin Marc Wright

Imperial Service Medal  (ISM)

 Blazey, Mr Stephen Kevin
 Devoy, Mr Samuel James Donnan
 Doran, Mr Eric
 Drain, Mr Michael Richard
 Foster, Mr Kevin
 Grimason, Mr Albert
 Holt, Mr John Frederick
 Huggins, Mr David Edward
 Kelsall, Mr Richard John
 Lowe, Miss Dionne Kathleen
 Machen, Mr Roger Michael
 Owen, Mr Michael Joseph
 Pink, Mr Dennis Christopher
 Roper, Mrs Sara Anne
 Rowley, Mr George Oliver
 Shelley, Mr Arnot Oswald
 Smith, Mr Ian William
 Smith, Mrs Jean Best
 Van Der Pol, Mrs Christine Muriel
 Waller, Mr Gary
 Doak , Miss Rosalind Wendy
 Aregbesola, Mrs Tolulope
 Frodin, Mrs Carolin
 Lawer, Mr Martyn John
 Oldroyd, Mr Hugh
 Oliver, Mr Roger Graham
 Reay, Mr John
 Stoddart, Mrs Catherine
 Veal, Mrs Joan
 Wilcock, Mrs Helen
 Burke, Mrs Lesley
 Mitchell, Mrs Margaret
 Pugh, Mrs Lynne
 Simpson, Mrs Betty
 Stubbins, Mrs Maria

Mention in Despatches 

 Acting Corporal Jonathan Robert McNair, Royal Marines
 Corporal Craig Tucker, Royal Marines
 Acting Corporal Donald Boadu Amoah
 Major Thomas James Armitage
 Sergeant Matthew Lee Baldwin
 Rifleman Rajeev Bhoyraz
 Guardsman Ronan Boyce
 Corporal of Horse Alexander James Cawley
 Major Andrew John Child
 Acting Major Adrian Paul Thomas Clayton
 Lieutenant Alexander Edward Floyd
 Trooper Jake John Foster
 Acting Lance Corporal Christopher James Harris
 Private Alexander Francis Hoar
 Sergeant Richard Charles Kerry
 Sapper James Ieuan McDermott
 Corporal Jonathan Kevin Richards
 Lance Corporal of Horse Kevin John Sedgwick
 Flight Lieutenant Jason Andrew Hunt
 Master Aircrew Robert Sean Sunderland

Queen's Commendation for Bravery 

 Corporal Neil Bowness
 Sapper Sean Alexander Alan Cameron
 Lance Corporal Sinead Dodds
 Corporal Conner Ryan Grant
 Lance Corporal Neil Meyer
 Sergeant Saiasi Nuku Vono
 Chief Petty Officer Marine Engineering Mechanic (M) Neil Andrew Halsey
 Leading Seaman (Diver) John Pearson

Queen's Commendation for Valuable Service 

 Lieutenant Commander Lawrence John Dunne, 
 Staff Sergeant Christopher Anderson
 Lieutenant Colonel Stephen Archer, 
 Lieutenant Colonel Edward Graham St John Brockman
 Captain Kempley McKnight Alexander Buchan-Smith
 Acting Lieutenant Colonel Douglas John Scott Cochran
 Captain Rachael Joanne Cull
 Major Timothy James Jonathan Draper
 Captain Maria Elizabeth Eegan
 Lieutenant Colonel Michael Richard Elviss, 
 Captain Jonathan Robert Frankling
 Warrant Officer Class 2 Kevin Stuart Anthony Gahgan
 Corporal Mark Gerald Harris
 Lieutenant Colonel Timothy David How
 Captain Thomas William Johnston-Burt
 Staff Sergeant Adam Landers Marshall
 Major Edward David Lionel Maskell-Pedersen
 Major Gary Allen McGown, 
 Colonel Stephen Christopher McMahon, 
 Warrant Officer Class 1 Colin Lee Nufer
 Lieutenant Colonel David Robert Orr Ewing, 
 Sapper Adam Robert Oxley
 Major Jonathan Anthony Evett Palmer, 
 Colonel Andrew William Phillips
 Corporal Aaron Michael Rennie
 Staff Sergeant Clinton Sherratt
 Lieutenant Colonel Paul Terence Tedman
 Lieutenant Colonel Jason Michael Williams
 Lance Corporal Alexander Edwin William Price
 Mrs Lisa Pamela Gardner
 Miss Penny Hughes
 Inspector Danny Johnston May
 Major Grant Paul Abbott, Royal Marines
 Commodore Simon James Ancona
 Lieutenant Karl Ashton
 Chief Petty Officer Air Engineering Technician (M) Derek Ashurst
 Commander Christopher Anthony Godwin
 Chief Petty Officer Engineering Technician (Marine Engineering) David Alan Kennedy
 Lieutenant Commander John Peter Ryan
 Commander Mark Adrian Hudson Wooller
 Major Alexandra Emily Caroline Benn, 
 Brigadier Richard Friedrich Patrick Felton, 
 Major (now Acting Lieutenant Colonel) Phillip John Fox, 
 Captain Harriet Louise Haslam-Greene
 Captain Paul Harvey Keymer
 Lieutenant Colonel Matthew James Patrick Murphy
 Wing Commander Andrew Philip Challen
 Flight Lieutenant David John Clemens
 Wing Commander Charles Scott Donald

Order of St John

Bailiff Grand Cross of the Order of St John 
 David Patrick Henry Burgess, 
 Major General Professor John Hemsley Pearn, 
 Low Bin Tick, 
 Alfred Marshall Acuff, Jr

Knight/Dame of the Order of St John 

 David Ward Jenkins
 His Excellency General The Honourable Sir Peter Cosgrove, 
 The Right Honourable The Viscount Brookeborough, 
 Palmer Clarkson Hamilton
 Norman Kelvin Stoller, 
 Douglas Lithgow Paul
 Dr Bruce Eldon Spivey
 William Henry Told Jr
 Karen Kay Johnson Pardoe
 Shirley Kingsland Richardson
 Sir John Anthony Swire, 
 Sir Henry Egerton Aubrey-Fletcher
 Dr Mok Lai Foo David
 Miss Pamela Jane Willis
 Lieutenant Colonel Clarence Thomas Hogg 
 Major James Richard Kelly
 Alderman Alan Colin Drake Yarrow
 Colonel Christopher John Blunden, 
 His Excellency Sir Rodney Williams,

Commander of the Order of St John 

 Timothy Boughton
 Major Peter John Colyer
 Henry Fetherstonhaugh, 
 Robert Stanley Harrison
 Stephen Hughes
 Michael Eric Lambell, 
 Jonathon Poyner
 Richard Roberts
 Brigadier Iain Gregory Robertson, 
 Mrs Eluned Clifton-Davies
 Mrs Daryl Margaret Perkins
 Mrs Celia Ann Streeter
 Dr Liu Bing-fai
 Dr Sarath Malcolm Samarage
 Dr Don Wilmot Weerasooriya
 John Michael Wright
 Mrs Barbara Taylor
 Dr Nicholas John Astbury
 Nevin Christian Brown
 Julian Victor Brandt III
 Douglas Hayward Evans
 Peter Irving Channing Knowles II
 Walter William Moore II
 Howard Pyle
 George Thomas Williamson
 John Nicholas Woolfe
 David Morris Yudain
 Ms Erika DeWyllie Billick
 Kathryn Spotswood Lines Cox III
 Mary Catherine Metzger Harvey
 Alan Roy Butterfield
 Charles Roderick Spencer Fowler, 
 Norman Gareth Gooding
 Dr Rex Anthony Smith
 David Malcolm Thomas
 John Douglas Wills
 Mrs Pauline Anne Buchanan
 Jennifer Burkett
 Mrs Claire Theresa Hensman
 Miss Patricia Mary Holten
 Mrs Lynn Margaret Mosley
 Raymond Bugeja
 Captain Reuben Lanfranco
 Revd Canon Simon Henry Martin Godfrey
 Lieutenant Colonel Josef Johannes Le Roux, MMM
 Dr Donati Njama
 Miss Margaret Jackson Lee
 Mrs Hazel Jennifer Watson

Officer of the Order of St John 

 Dean Steven Allen
 Major Robert Charles Cole
 Eric Collinson
 Michael Davies
 Paul Victor Dedman, 
 Edmund Fitzhugh, 
 Stuart Fletcher, 
 Adam Gosling
 Henry Goulding
 Rhodri Griffiths
 Derek Howell
 Michael King
 David John Leeser
 Kevin Michael Lilwall
 Timothy McVey
 Richard Pearce
 Major Stephen Smedley
 Wayne Warlow
 David Trevor Huxley Williams
 Ernest Woodhall
 Mrs Rosemary Butler
 Mrs Joyce Charlton
 Miss Geraldine Mary Costello
 Miss Valerie Mary Costello
 Mrs Sarah Duss
 Miss Helen Elizabeth Gilbertson
 Mrs Helen Gwilliam
 Mrs Cathrin Hughes
 Mrs Hazel Lewis
 Mrs Anna Winifred Lucas, 
 Professor Donna Mead, 
 Mrs Eleanor Merrills
 Mrs Rachel Needs
 Mrs Irene Joyce Phillips
 Mrs Irene Mary Maude Phillips
 Mrs Josephine Roberts
 Miss Heather Ann Robertson
 Mrs Moya Travis
 Dr Chung Ka-leung
 Wasantha Palinda Edirisinghe
 Godamunne Rathnayaka Mudiyanselage Gedara Muthu Banda Godamunne
 Tuan Farook Jayah
 Mahagamaralalage Sunil Jayaseela
 Nandasena Kananke
 Mohamed Haniffa Mohamed Khaleel
 Watutanthrige Mahiman Prasantha Lal De Alwis
 Lam Hoo-tak
 Lee Wing-tak Patre
 Leung Tai-lin
 Denipitiya Withanage Don Upali Perera
 Prangige Sarath Nanda Kumara Perera
 Tuan Zuheer Raban
 Nihal Indrajith Ramanayake
 Errol Gregory Smith
 Yau Shu-fung
 Ms Chan Kit-har Josephine
 Mrs Ng King-chu
 Gerald John Buddle
 James George Naphambo
 Zunga Siakalima
 Mrs Marilyn Jeanne James
 Miss Julie Walton
 Mrs Cynthia White
 Thomas Pera Alexander
 Damian Sergiu Antonescu
 Carl Grover Berry
 John Garland Pollard Boatwright
 Daryl Glynn Byrd
 Dr James Marvin Campbell
 Sir Thomas Vincent Fean, 
 Guy Wallis Morton
 Fouad Ibrahim El-Najjar
 Mazen Ezzat  Qupty
 Dr Sami Rashad Sukhtian
 Anthony Carlton Coe
 Todd Alexander Culbertson
 Dr Michael Thomas Bryan Dennis
 William Patrick Enright
 James Marvin Hutchisson
 Dr Thomas Morgan Hyers
 John Oliver Geoffrey Jenkins
 Martin M. Koffel
 The Reverend Kirk Allan Lee
 Dwain Gregory Jr
 Forrest Edward Mars Jr
 Dr Charles Stebner Mosteller
 Edward Sidney Oppenheimer
 Rowland Andrew Radford Jr
 The Reverend William Lewis Sachs
 Leland Clay Selby
 Dr James Leigh Snyder
 James Arthur Zurn
 Miss Ann Isabel Daugherty
 Mrs Palmer Peebles Garson
 Mrs Elizabeth Susanne Koffel
 Mrs Adrienne Leichtle Maxwell
 Mrs Natalie Thomas Pray
 Ms Maxey Jerome Roberts
 Mrs Elisheva Shaked
 Mrs Virginia Creary Smith Snider
 Mrs Diana Strawbridge Wister
 Cheong Kee Toh
 Chua Ping Ping Nelson
 Liang Chiang Heng
 Doctor Sarvaselan Reuben Emmanuel Sayampanathan
 Terence Robert George Blacktop
 Trevor Anthony Brooks
 Stuart Russell Chalmers
 Dr Kung-Kim Chan
 Robert Hugh Foulkes
 Reverend Richard John Gray
 Richard James Marlow
 Surgeon Rear Admiral Calum James Gibb McArthur, 
 Dr Roger Charles Milner
 Charles Albert Myers
 John Lennox Napier
 Jon-Brian Parker
 Derek Stanley Seiver
 Martyn Clive Steers
 David Harding Verity
 Captain Louis Roland Uppiah
 Rev David Alexander Van Oeveren
 Brian Edward Weldon
 Alastair Stuart McGregor Wood
 Mrs Julie Ann Brayne
 Mrs Melanie Anne Buckland
 Mrs Joanne Marie Conroy
 Miss Susan Jane Crowhurst
 Mrs Enid Susan Gathercole
 Mrs Janice Kathryn Houston
 Miss Susan Hunter
 Mrs Deborah Ann Lewis
 Mrs Cicely Mary Napier
 Mrs Dorothy Ruth Tuck
 Mrs Barbara Ann Tyekiff
 Dr Fenella Kate Wrigley
 Mrs Sarah Catherine Mary Shilson, 
 Christopher Borg Cardona
 Franco Caruana
 Dr Mohamed Farooq Chaudhry
 Brian Philip Cranmer
 Andrew Grech
 Noel Grixti D’Amato
 Jonathan Paul Knight
 Alex Odhiambo Ouma
 Andrew Pizzuto
 Andrico Regardo Stephanus
 Brendan Laurence Voigt
 George Thomas Woods
 Mrs Theresa Debarro
 Dr Zipporah Njeri Gathuya
 Miss Dorothy Lefela Matsho
 Mrs Zulfah Mohamed

References 

Special Honours
2014 awards in the United Kingdom
British honours system